2018–19 Eerste Klasse was a Dutch Eerste Klasse association football season of the Eerste Klasse.

Saturday sections 
Participating clubs and champions were:

A: West I 
 FC Aalsmeer
 Amsterdamsche FC 
 SV ARC
 SV Argon
 CSV BOL
 FC Breukelen
 CSW
 DHSC Champion
 SV Huizen
 Roda '46
 HFC Victoria
 HEDW
 Zuidvogels
 Zwaluwen '30

B: West II 
 VV Brielle
 BVCB
 Deltasport 
 SV Die Haghe
 Forum Sport
 SV Heinenoord
 SV Honselersdijk
 VV Kloetinge
 De Meeuwen
 SV Poortugaal
 VV Rijsoord Champion
 RVVH
 VV SHO
 Westlandia

C: South 
 VV Almkerk
 Geinoord
 GJS Gorinchem
 GRC '14 
 VV Heerjansdam
 LRC Leerdam 
 VV Montfoort
 VV Nieuw-Lekkerland
 SV Oranje Wit
 VV Sliedrecht
 Sportlust '46 Champion
 SVL 
 VVGZ 
 VV WNC

D: East 
 VV Bennekom
 DOS '37
 ASV Dronten
 DTS Ede
 DZC '68
 Enter Vooruit
 Go-Ahead Kampen 
 VV Hierden
 VV KHC 
 De Merino's
 NSC Nijkerk Champion
 VV Nunspeet
 VV Scherpenzeel
 SDV Barneveld

E: North 
 VV Balk 
 Be Quick Dokkum
 SV Bedum
 Broekster Boys 
 Drachtster Boys 
 VV Gorecht 
 VV Groningen 
 HZVV Champion
 Noordscheschut 
 Olde Veste 
 Oranje Nassau Groningen 
 PKC '83 
 VV Winsum 
 Zeerobben

Sunday sections 
Participating clubs and champions were:

A: West I 
 AFC '34 
 AGB 
 FC Boshuizen 
 DSOV 
 SV Hillegom 
 SV Hoofddorp 
 JOS Watergraafsmeer
 Legmeervogels 
 LSVV
 SV NVC
 FC Uitgeest 
 RKVV Velsen Champion
 Zaanlandia
 AVV Zeeburgia

B: West II 
 VV BMT
 SV Den Hoorn
 DHC Delft
 DOSKO
 GLZ Delfshaven
 VV Groeneweg
 Moerse Boys
 Olympia Gouda 
 Rood Wit W
 Spartaan '20
 SV VELO 
 VOC Champion 
 VUC
 CVV Zwervers

C: South I 
 RKVV Alverna
 RKVV Brabantia
 Best Vooruit
 HVCH
 Juliana '31 Champion
 SV Leones
 Nemelaer
 Oirschot Vooruit
 TOP Oss
 RKSV Prinses Irene
 RKSV Rhode
 FC Tilburg
 SC Woezik
 SC 't Zand

D: South II 
 RKSV Bekkerveld
 VV Chevremont
 SV Deurne 
 EHC Heuts Champion
 VV Geldrop
 RKSV Heeze
 De Valk
 SV Venray
 VV Schaesberg
 SC Susteren 
 Venlosche Boys
 RKVV Veritas
 RKSV Wittenhorst 
 ZSV

E: East 
 BVC '12
 FC Winterswijk
 HVV Tubantia
 KSV BWO
 Longa '30 Champion
 RKSV De Zweef
 RKVV Stevo
 ROHDA Raalte
 SC Bemmel
 SC NEC
 TVC '28
 VV Heino
 VV Rigtersbleek
 WAVV

F: North 
 BOSO Sneek
 FVC
 GAVC
 Gomos
 GRC Groningen
 Noordster
 SC Stadspark
 SVBO
 VKW
 VV Bergum 
 VV Emmen Champion
 VV Heerenveen 
 VV Nieuw Buinen
 WVV 1896

References 

Eerste Klasse seasons
5